Chess at the 2017 Asian Indoor and Martial Arts Games was held in Ashgabat, Turkmenistan from 21 to 27 September 2017 at the Chess Centre.

Medalists

Men

Women

Medal table

Results

Men

Individual standard
21–24 September

Team blitz
27 September

Swiss round

Knockout round

Team rapid

Swiss round
25–26 September

Knockout round
26 September

Team blitz (U23)
27 September

Swiss round

Knockout round

Team rapid (U23)

Swiss round
25–26 September

Knockout round
26 September

Women

Individual standard
21–24 September

Team blitz
27 September

Swiss round

Knockout round

Team rapid

Swiss round
25–26 September

Knockout round
26 September

Team blitz (U23)
27 September

Swiss round

Knockout round

Team rapid (U23)

Swiss round
25–26 September

Knockout round
26 September

References 
 Medalists by events

External links
 Official website
 Results book – Chess

2017 Asian Indoor and Martial Arts Games events
Asian Indoor and Martial Arts Games
2017